Tulata is a rural locality (a selo) and the administrative center of Tulatinsky Selsoviet, Charyshsky District, Altai Krai, Russia. The population was 728 as of 2013. There are 28 streets.

Geography 
Tulata is located 20 km southwest of Charyshskoye (the district's administrative centre) by road. Krasny Partizan is the nearest rural locality.

References 

Rural localities in Tselinny District, Altai Krai